Kirkmichael Bridge is a two-segmental-arched bridge in Kirkmichael, Perth and Kinross, Scotland. A Category B listed structure built in 1840, it crosses the River Ardle, connecting the village centre to the north with the Balnald area to the south. The bridge, which stands just to the north of Pitcarmick Bridge, is toll-free.

The bridge was damaged in flooding in 1847.

See also
List of listed buildings in Kirkmichael, Perth and Kinross

References

Listed bridges in Scotland
Category B listed buildings in Perth and Kinross
Bridges in Perth and Kinross
Stone bridges in Scotland
Transport in Perth and Kinross
Bridges completed in 1840
1840 establishments in Scotland